Pornpong Pornjamsai (born 13 November 1987) is a professional footballer from Thailand. He currently plays for Ayutthaya in the Thai League 3.

He previously played for Bangkok University in the 2007 AFC Champions League group stage.

References

1987 births
Living people
Pornpong Pornjamsai
Pornpong Pornjamsai
Association football midfielders
Pornpong Pornjamsai
Pornpong Pornjamsai
Pornpong Pornjamsai
Pornpong Pornjamsai
Pornpong Pornjamsai
Pornpong Pornjamsai
Pornpong Pornjamsai
Pornpong Pornjamsai